Dean Kay (born June 21, 1940) is a US American entertainer, recording artist, songwriter and music publishing executive.

Career
Kay was born in Oakland, California. He attended San Jose State University from 1958 to 1962. While a student, he began his professional career as a featured entertainer (along with singing partner Hank Jones) on the five-day-a-week daytime Tennessee Ernie Ford Show from San Francisco. They recorded for both Del-Fi Records and RCA Victor.

As a songwriter he provided songs for many top recording artists, including "That's Life" for Frank Sinatra.

He was COO for Lawrence Welk's music publishing companies for 18 years. He then became President/CEO of PolyGram International Publishing.

Along the way he has been the chief caretaker of the creative treasures of Jerome Kern, Richard Rodgers, Oscar Hammerstein II, Cole Porter, Elton John, Bernie Taupin, Johnny Horton, Don Williams, Bob McDill, Wayland Holyfield, Ricky Skaggs, Rick Springfield and many others.

Kay sits on the Board of Directors of ASCAP, and the ASCAP Foundation. His past included stints on the Boards of The National Music Publishers Association (NMPA), The Harry Fox Agency (HFA) Country Music Association (CMA), Academy of Country Music (ACM), the California Copyright Conference (CCC), and the Association of Independent Music Publishers (AIMP).

His daily email news digest, The Dean's List, lists news about music, copyright and new technology in the entertainment industry. The Dean's List and its sister web publication, The ASCAP Daily Brief (powered by The Dean's List) is free for qualified interested parties.

References

External links
Official website

1940 births
Living people
American entertainers
American male songwriters
American male singer-songwriters
American music industry executives